Jake's Journey was a television pilot created, co-written and starring Monty Python member Graham Chapman in 1988. It was one of the last projects for Chapman and the last for director Hal Ashby.

The script is included in the book Ojril: The Complete Incomplete Graham Chapman.

Plot
A teenage boy time travels back to the Middle Ages. He meets George, a knight and they embark on a quest together.

Cast

Chris Young - Jake
Graham Chapman - Sir George/Queen/Taxi Driver
Peter Cook - King
Nancy Lenehan - Jake's Mother
Lane Smith - Jake's Father
Gabrielle Anwar -Princess/Fiona Penwarden
Rik Mayall - Troll
Alexei Sayle - Head Torturer
Liz Smith - Witch
Griff Rhys Jones - Innkeeper
Richard Strange - Lobster 1
Tony Slattery - Lobster 2
Susie Blake - Torturer's Wife
Daniel Peacock - British Telecom Engineer

References

External links
 

1988 films
1988 television films
Films directed by Hal Ashby
Films with screenplays by Graham Chapman
Television pilots not picked up as a series
Films about time travel
Films set in the Middle Ages
1980s English-language films